The 2011 Thailand Open Grand Prix Gold was a badminton tournament which took place at the Chulalongkorn University Sport Complex in Bangkok, Thailand on 7–12 June 2011 and had a total purse of $120,000.

Men's singles

Seeds

 Chen Long (champion)
 Boonsak Ponsana (third round)
 Park Sung-hwan (semifinals)
 Chen Jin (semifinals)
 Marc Zwiebler (first round)
 Lee Hyun-il (final)
 Hu Yun (second round)
 Rajiv Ouseph (first round)
 Son Wan-ho (first round)
 Wang Zhengming (quarterfinals)
 Tommy Sugiarto (third round)
 Wong Wing Ki (first round)
 Brice Leverdez (third round)
 Parupalli Kashyap (quarterfinals)
 Dicky Palyama (first round)
 Wong Choong Hann (quarterfinals)

Finals

Women's singles

Seeds

 Saina Nehwal (quarterfinals)
 Jiang Yanjiao (final)
 Bae Yeon-ju (quarterfinals)
 Porntip Buranaprasertsuk (semifinals)
 Juliane Schenk (quarterfinals)
 Cheng Shao-chieh (semifinals)
 Li Xuerui (champion)
 Sung Ji-hyun (quarterfinals)

Finals

Men's doubles

Seeds

  Jung Jae-sung / Lee Yong-dae (champion)
  Ko Sung-hyun / Yoo Yeon-seong (semifinals)
  Fang Chieh-min / Lee Sheng-mu (quarterfinals)
  Alvent Yulianto Chandra / Hendra Aprida Gunawan (final)
  Chai Biao / Guo Zhendong (quarterfinals)
  Cho Gun-woo / Kwon Yi-goo (first round)
  Ingo Kindervater / Johannes Schoettler (quarterfinals)
  Howard Bach / Tony Gunawan (semifinals)

Finals

Women's doubles

Seeds

  Duanganong Aroonkesorn / Kunchala Voravichitchaikul (first round)
  Shinta Mulia Sari / Yao Lei (first round)
  Lotte Jonathans / Paulien van Dooremalen (first round)
  Sandra Marinello / Birgit Michels (second round)
  Tian Qing / Zhao Yunlei (champion)
  Ha Jung-eun / Kim Min-jung (second round)
  Cheng Shu / Bao Yixin (final)
  Jwala Gutta / Ashwini Ponnappa (first round)

Finals

Mixed doubles

Seeds

  Sudket Prapakamol / Saralee Thoungthongkam (quarterfinals)
  Songphon Anugritayawon / Kunchala Voravichitchaikul (quarterfinals)
  Michael Fuchs / Birgit Michels (second round)
  Lee Sheng-mu / Chien Yu-chin (champion)
  Xu Chen / Ma Jin (semifinals)
  Chan Peng Soon / Goh Liu Ying (withdrew)
  Lee Yong-dae / Ha Jung-eun (quarterfinals)
  Nova Widianto / Vita Marissa (final)

Finals

References

External links
 Tournament Link

Thailand Open
Thailand Open Grand Prix Gold
Badminton, Grand Prix Gold, Thailand Open
Badminton, Grand Prix Gold, Thailand Open
Thailand Open (badminton)
Badminton, Grand Prix Gold, Thailand Open